Athletic pubalgia, also called sports hernia, core injury, hockey hernia, hockey groin, Gilmore's groin, or groin disruption is a medical condition of the pubic joint affecting athletes.

It is a syndrome characterized by chronic groin pain in athletes and a dilated superficial ring of the inguinal canal. Football and ice hockey players are affected most frequently. Both recreational and professional athletes may be affected.

Presentation
Symptoms include pain during sports movements, particularly hip extension, and twisting and turning. This pain usually radiates to the adductor muscle region and even the testicles, although it is often difficult for the patient to pin-point the exact location.

Following sporting activity the person with athletic pubalgia will be stiff and sore. The day after a match, getting out of bed or a car will be difficult. Any exertion that increases intra-abdominal pressure, such as coughing, sneezing, or sporting activity can cause pain. In the early stages, the person may be able to continue playing their sport, but the problem usually gets progressively worse.

As pain in the groin and pelvis can be referred from a number of problems, including injuries to the lumbar spine, the hip joint, the sacro-iliac joint, the abdomen, and the genito-urinary system,  diagnosis of athletic pubalgia requires skillful differentiation and pubic examination in certain cases where there is intense groin pain.

Diagnosis
The diagnosis is based on the patient's history, clinical signs, and, increasingly, an MRI exam. Symptoms can often be reproduced by maneuvers such as performing sit-ups or crunches.  Pain can also be elicited with the patient in a "frog position", in which the patient is supine with knees bent and heels together.

The exact lesion may differ, but common pathologic findings at operation are:
 torn external oblique aponeurosis
 tear in the conjoint tendon
 conjoint tendon torn from pubic tubercle
 dehiscence between conjoined tendon and inguinal ligament
 tear in the fascia transversalis
 abnormal insertion of the rectus abdominis muscle
 tear of the abdominal internal oblique muscle from the pubic tubercle
 entrapment of the ilioinguinal nerve or genitofemoral nerve
Several of these lesions may occur simultaneously. Also, many athletes have concomitant weakness or tearing of the adductor muscles or labral tears of the hip.
When the adductor muscles are tight post injury, that can be enough to trigger symptoms.

Treatment
Conservative therapies (gentle stretching and a short period of rest) may temporarily alleviate the pain, but definitive treatment consists of surgical repair followed by a structured rehabilitation.
The first conservative treatment option should be to restore normal motion after the adductor has begun to heal (usually 6–8 weeks post injury). Sleeping in a prone position with the hip on the affected side flexed and externally rotated can be a cure in some individuals.

Incidence
The exact incidence of these entities is unknown: some believe it is the most common cause of chronic groin pain in athletes, while others argue that it is only rare.

References

External links 

Sports medicine
Injuries of abdomen, lower back, lumbar spine and pelvis